Bhupendra may refer to:

 Bhupendra Bahadur Thapa, Nepalese politician
 Bhupendra Chaudhary, Indian politician
 Bhupendra Singh (Madhya Pradesh politician) (born 1960)
 Bhupendra Kainthola (born 1966), current director of the FTII
 Bhupendra Kumar Datta (1892–1979), Indian freedom fighter
 Bhupendra Kumar Modi (born 1949), Indian social entrepreneur
 Bhupendra Narayan Mandal (1904–1975), Indian politician
 Bhupendra Nath Goswami (born 1950), Indian meteorologist
 Bhupendra Nath Kaushik (1924–2007), Indian poet
 Bhupendra Nath Misra, Indian politician
 Bhupendra Nath Mitra (1875–1937), Indian diplomat
 Bhupendra Silwal (1935–2012), Nepalese long-distance runner
 Bhupendra Yadav (born 1959), Director General of Police of Rajasthan in the Indian Police Service

Other uses
 Dr. Bhupendra Nath Dutta Smriti Mahavidyalaya, an Indian college 
 Bhupendra Narayan Mandal University an Indian university